Santiago De Sagastizabal (born 9 May 1997) is an Argentine professional footballer who plays as a centre-forward for Ansan Greeners.

Club career
De Sagastizabal had stints in the academies of Boca Juniors, Argentinos Juniors and Gimnasia y Esgrima, which preceded a move to Brown in August 2018. Signed by manager Pablo Vicó, the forward appeared as an unused substitute for a Primera B Nacional match with Guillermo Brown on 26 August. In the following September, De Sagastizabal made his professional bow in a 3–1 defeat to Atlético de Rafaela at the Estadio Nuevo Monumental; being subbed on late for Ignacio Liporace. He departed in June 2019, subsequently trialling at Italian Serie D side Este across July and August.

On 9 October 2019, it was confirmed that De Sagastizabal had joined Italian Eccellenza Lombardy side Pavia. He left on 21 December after scoring three goals, subsequently joining US Anconitana of Eccellenza Marche ahead of 2020. In the succeeding August, after seven appearances, De Sagastizabal switched clubs after agreeing terms with Eccellenza Emilia-Romagna's GS Felino. On 26 January 2021, De Sagastizabal completed a move to South Korea with K League 2 team Ansan Greeners.

Personal life

Career statistics
.

References

External links

	

1997 births
Living people
Place of birth missing (living people)
Argentine footballers
Association football forwards
Argentine expatriate footballers
Expatriate footballers in Italy
Expatriate footballers in South Korea
Argentine expatriate sportspeople in Italy
Argentine expatriate sportspeople in South Korea
Primera Nacional players
Eccellenza players
Club Atlético Brown footballers
F.C. Pavia players
Ansan Greeners FC players